Jessica "Jay" Carly Anstey (born 13 February 1991), popularly known as Jay Anstey, is a South African actress and model. She is best known for the roles in the films, Sleeper's Wake, Farewell Ella Bella, Tremors: A Cold Day in Hell, and Hell Trip.

Personal life
Jessica was born on 13 February 1991 in Pretoria, South Africa. Her father Norman Anstey is also an actor and her mother Penny Anstey was a ballet dancer with PACT ballet. During school life, she excelled in piano, singing and ballroom dancing. She has one sister: Amy, who is also an actress.

She had a long standing relationship with Jonathan Boynton-Lee, a fellow actor and Top Billing presenter. They also got nominated by "You Spec" as a couple of the year. However, they separated citing miscommunication and conflicting schedules. Then in 2017, she dated with Sean Kaplan.

In 2021, she married fellow actor Sean-Marco Vorster.

Career
She obtained her national diploma in dramatic arts from the Pretoria Technikon. After completing her diploma, she started to feature in commercials for Supersport, Red Berry, the University of Johannesburg and Edgars.

In 2006, he made film debut with Catch a Fire and played the role "Katie Vos". After that she appeared in many films such as Two Worlds, Sleeper's Wake, Friend Request and Rakka. In 2011, she made the television debut with the role "Charlie Holmes" on SABC3 soapie Isidingo. The role became her turning point in the acting career, where she played the role for seven consecutive years until 2012. In 2012, Anstey appeared in the Canadian film Inescapable. In 2013, she joined with the fifth season of the SABC1 reality competition Tropika Island of Treasure as one of the celebrity contestant. After that, in the same year, she joined with the sixth season of the SABC3 reality competition Strictly Come Dancing. Meanwhile, she made television appearances in M-Net series Snitch, Rhythm City on e.tv and Young Leonardo for the BBC.

In 2018, she made the lead role "Elle" in the horror film Farewell Ella Bella. The film was made theatrical screening in the USA. In 2020, she joined with the M-Net (DStv 101) television serial Inconceivable. In the same year, she joined with another serial Legacy with the role "Alexandra "Lexi" Price".

Filmography

References

External links
 IMDb

Living people
South African film actresses
South African television actresses
South African models
1991 births
People from Pretoria